The California Sunday Magazine was a longform Sunday magazine featuring stories about the Western United States, Latin America, and Asia. In June 2021 it won a Pulitzer Prize, eight months after the magazine ceased publication. The prize was awarded in feature writing for a story on refugees and potential immigrants crossing the Darién Gap by freelance writer Nadja Drost.

History
The California Sunday Magazine was founded in October 2014 by Douglas McGray and Chas Edwards. The first issue was delivered to 400,000 households as an insert with the Sunday editions of the Los Angeles Times, the New York Times, the Sacramento Bee, the San Francisco Chronicle, and the San Diego Union-Tribune.

In 2016, the magazine won the National Magazine Award for overall excellence in print magazine photography. Other finalists included National Geographic, New York, Vanity Fair, and The Wall Street Journal.

In 2018, California Sunday was acquired by Emerson Collective. California Sunday moved to publishing online-only in June 2020. Emerson Collective spun off Pop-Up Magazine Productions in August 2020. California Sunday suspended all publication in October 2020.

Pop-Up Magazine 

California Sunday, Inc. also produces a live show called Pop-Up Magazine. McGray said: “We started a media company. We approached it like a story production company. Some of the things we’d make would be live experiences, live stories, and some of the things we’d make would be stories for you to read at home.”

References

External links
 

Defunct magazines published in the United States
Magazines established in 2014
Magazines disestablished in 2020
Magazines published in San Francisco
Monthly magazines published in the United States
Newspaper supplements
Online magazines published in the United States
Sunday magazines
2018 mergers and acquisitions